The 40th running of the Tour of Flanders cycling classic was held on Easter Monday, 2 April 1956. French rider Jean Forestier won the race after a late breakaway from a 30-strong group in Wetteren. Sprint specialist Stan Ockers won the sprint for second place; Leon Van Daele was third. 37 of 122 riders finished.

Route
The race started in Ghent and finished in Wetteren – totaling 238 km. The course featured five categorized climbs:
 Kwaremont
 Kruisberg
 Statieberg
 Eikenberg
 Kattenberg

Results

References

1956
1956 in road cycling
1956 in Belgian sport
1956 Challenge Desgrange-Colombo
April 1956 sports events in Europe